Yu Yijie (born September 1, 1995), is a Chinese actor and model. He is best known for his roles of king Yu Xiao in the 2017 web series, Men with Sword 2, and Xu Jiamu in Pretty Man.

Biography 
Yu born in Wuxi, Jiangsu, on September 1, 1995. He debuted as an actor in 2017, portraying the kind and noble king Yu Xiao in the second season of the all-male web series Men with Sword. The series was released on June 15, 2017. In 2018, he portrayed Situ Lu in the movie Spiritpact, based on the web comic of the same name. The same year, he appeared in another movie, The War Records of Deification, as well in series like Pretty Man and Hi, I'm Saori. In 2019, he will star in the series Young Blood Agency.

Filmography

Web series

Movies

References

External links 

 Official web site

1995 births
Living people
Chinese male television actors
Chinese male film actors
21st-century Chinese male actors